The gal mesedi was a Hittite military and administrative title literally meaning "chief of the royal bodyguards". He was in charge of the Mesedi, the personal bodyguard of the Hittite king. It is considered to be one of the most important and prestigious posts of the Hittite Kingdom.

History 
The gal mesedi was a commander responsible for the safety of the king himself. On most cases he was a member of the royal family and sometimes the brother of the king, whom he sometimes succeeded as in the case of Hattusili III, who before becoming a king was the gal mesedi of his brother, King Muwatalli II. A gal mesedi could also at times command independent military units that weren't under the king's jurisdiction.

See also 
Gal dubsar
Gal gestin

Sources 
Notes

References

Military ranks
Hittite titles